Evgeniya Rodina was the defending champion, but lost in the quarterfinals. 
Vitalia Diatchenko won the third edition of this tournament, defeating Akgul Amanmuradova in the final, 6–4, 6–1.

Seeds

Draw

Finals

Top half

Bottom half

References
 Main Draw
 Qualifying Draw

President's Cup (tennis) - Singles
2011 Women's Singles